The Grote Houtstraat is a shopping street in Haarlem that connects the Grote Markt to the Houtplein in the direction of the Haarlemmerhout woods.

History
The street runs along one of two old parallel roads running through the city on either side of the Grote Markt linking Heemstede to Schoten, and is one of the oldest streets in Haarlem. 

The Grote Houtstraat in Haarlem was originally just called the "Houtstraat" (Wood street) as it was the major road leading from the Grote Markt to the woods called the Haarlemmerhout.

Shopping street
The street is lined with rijksmonuments such as the Verwey Hall, the Doopsgezinde Kerk, the Proveniershuis and the society Trou moet Blycken. 

The Dutch version of Monopoly includes three streets of Haarlem including the Barteljorisstraat, the Zijlweg, and the "Houtstraat" which refers to the Grote Houtstraat and the Kleine Houtstraat. All four of these streets are shopping streets today that connect pedestrians from the north, west and south to the Grote Markt.

References

External link

Streets in Haarlem